2StepMarv is the second studio album by Kjwan. It was released through Barnyard Music Philippines in 2006. The album spawned the singles "Pintura", "Sa Ilalim", "One Look", and "Shai".

Track listing

Personnel
Marc Abaya – vocals
Kelley Mangahas – bass
Jorel Corpus – guitars / percussion / vocals
J-Hoon Balbuena – drums / vocals
Boogie Romero – guitars / vocals

References

2006 albums
Kjwan albums